The John George Moroni Barnes House is a historic residence in Kaysville, Utah, United States, that is listed on the National Register of Historic Places (NRHP).

Description
The house was built in 1884 and was designed by William Allen. It is located at 42 West Center Street.  The house was listed on NRHP February 11, 1982.

According to its NRHP nomination, it "is significant because of its association with John G. M. Barnes, who succeeded his father, John R. Barnes, as the dominant business and political figure in Kaysville. It is also significant as an outstanding example of a Victorian mansion built in two sections and at least partially architect-designed."-->

See also

 National Register of Historic Places listings in Davis County, Utah

References

External links

Houses completed in 1884
Houses in Davis County, Utah
Houses on the National Register of Historic Places in Utah
Victorian architecture in Utah
National Register of Historic Places in Davis County, Utah